USS Pickering was a topsail schooner in the United States Revenue Cutter Service and then the United States Navy during the Quasi-War with France. She was named for Timothy Pickering, then the Secretary of State.

USRC Pickering was built at Newburyport, Massachusetts in 1798 for the Revenue Cutter Service. Captain Jonathan Chapman was her first commander. Taken into the Navy in July at the outbreak of the Quasi-War, she departed Boston on her first cruise on 22 August.

Service history
In 1799 and early 1800, she was part of Commodore Barry's squadron in the West Indies. Lieutenant Edward Preble commanded Pickering from January through June 1799, when he was promoted to captain and took command of the frigate .

Pickering was permanently transferred to the Navy on 20 May and re-designated USS Pickering.  Master Commandant Benjamin Hillar, U.S. Navy, assumed command in June, and continued command of the ship for its final years. Under Hillar's command Pickering fought a notable engagement with the French privateer L'Egypte Conquise on 18 October 1799. The Frenchman was well fitted out and manned and should have been able to capture Pickering. While the French ship carried fourteen 9-pounders, four 6-pounders, and crew of 250, the American cutter had only fourteen 4-pounders and seventy men. After a nine-hour battle, however, the French ship was forced to surrender. Pickering continued to cruise in the West Indies, and before her return to the United States had captured four French privateers, including Voltigeuse, Atalanta, L'Active, and Fly, and recaptured the American merchant ship Portland.

Pickering departed from Boston on 10 June 1800. Ordered to join Commodore Thomas Truxton's squadron on the Guadaloupe Station in the West Indies, she sailed from New Castle, Delaware on 20 August, and was never heard from again. She is presumed to have been lost with all hands in a gale in September, but this was never proven. This storm is also thought to have sunk , which likewise vanished without a trace. The exact cause of the cutter's disappearance remains a mystery.

References

Ships of the United States Revenue Cutter Service
Cutters of the United States Navy
Quasi-War ships of the United States
Missing ships
Ships built in Newburyport, Massachusetts
1798 ships
Maritime incidents in 1800
Ships lost with all hands
Shipwrecks